Hristiyan Stoyanov (born 20 August 1998) is a Bulgarian para-athlete who competes in middle-distance running. He represented Bulgaria in the Paralympic Games.

Career
Stoyanov represented Bulgaria at the 2020 Summer Paralympics in the men's 1500 metres T46 event and won a silver medal.

References

1998 births
Living people
People from Gabrovo
Paralympic athletes of Bulgaria
Medalists at the World Para Athletics Championships
Medalists at the World Para Athletics European Championships
Athletes (track and field) at the 2016 Summer Paralympics
Athletes (track and field) at the 2020 Summer Paralympics
Medalists at the 2020 Summer Paralympics
Paralympic silver medalists for Bulgaria
Paralympic medalists in athletics (track and field)
Bulgarian male middle-distance runners